Michael "Sonny" Murphy (27 July 1906 – 17 March 1936) was an Irish middle-distance runner. He competed in the men's 3000 metres steeplechase at the 1932 Summer Olympics.

References

1906 births
1936 deaths
Athletes (track and field) at the 1932 Summer Olympics
Irish male middle-distance runners
Irish male steeplechase runners
Olympic athletes of Ireland
Place of birth missing